Robert Joseph Ward (January 31, 1926 – August 5, 2003) was a United States district judge of the United States District Court for the Southern District of New York.

Education and career

Ward was born in New York City, New York. He received a Bachelor of Science degree from Harvard College in 1945. He received a Bachelor of Laws from Harvard Law School in 1949. He was a United States Naval Reserve Lieutenant (JG) from 1944 to 1946. He was in private practice of law in New York City from 1949 to 1951. He was an assistant district attorney of New York County from 1951 to 1955. He was an Assistant United States Attorney of the Southern District of New York from 1956 to 1961. He was in private practice of law in New York City from 1961 to 1972.

Federal judicial service

Ward was nominated by President Richard Nixon on September 25, 1972, to a seat on the United States District Court for the Southern District of New York vacated by Judge Frederick van Pelt Bryan. He was confirmed by the United States Senate on October 12, 1972, and received commission on October 17, 1972. He assumed senior status on February 1, 1991. His service was terminated on August 5, 2003, due to death.

Death

Ward died of cancer on August 5, 2003, in New York City.

See also
List of Jewish American jurists

References

External links
FJC Bio

1926 births
2003 deaths
Lawyers from New York City
Harvard Law School alumni
Judges of the United States District Court for the Southern District of New York
United States district court judges appointed by Richard Nixon
20th-century American judges
Harvard College alumni
Assistant United States Attorneys
United States Navy personnel of World War II
United States Navy officers
United States Navy reservists
Deaths from cancer in New York (state)